Szczakowa is a district of the Polish city of Jaworzno. It is located in the northern part of the city and is one of the most important rail hubs of the area.

It was first mentioned in 1427 as Sczacowa. In the years 1933–1956, it was a separate town, but in 1956 it was merged into Jaworzno.

During the German occupation (World War II), the occupiers operated the E732 forced labour subcamp of the Stalag VIII-B/344 prisoner-of-war camp for Allied POWs in Szczakowa.

It is where the football club Szczakowianka Jaworzno comes and derives its name from.

Notable people
 Antoni Popiel (1865–1910), Polish sculptor

References

Neighbourhoods in Silesian Voivodeship
Jaworzno